is a Japanese actor. He has appeared in more than 90 films since 1987.

Selected filmography

Films

Television

References

External links
 

1959 births
Living people
Male actors from Osaka
Japanese male film actors
Japanese male television actors
20th-century Japanese male actors
21st-century Japanese male actors